Jürgen Hans Milski (born 24 November 1963 in Cologne, Germany), known by his stage name BB Jürgen, is a German TV Presenter and Schlager Singer.

Career 
Milski initially worked as a sheet metal worker in the Ford Body and Assembly Plant in Niehl, Cologne. In 2000, in the first German season of Big Brother, he became one of the audience favorites, finishing second, alongside  , whom he befriended during the show. Afterwards he recorded his first single Großer Bruder' (Big Brother) with Trpkovski, which topped the German sales charts for several weeks with over 800,000 copies sold. He went on to make various television appearances and other music productions followed suit.

Since his Big Brother fame, Milski has made a living as a singer in Mallorca and as a carnival entertainer. In his book 'Ich sag's, he gives an insight into his experiences with the television industry. From March 2005 to February 2016 he presented call-in competitions on 9Live and Sport1. In September 2005, he starred in the Big Brother season 6 celebrity special. From 2006 to 2015 he took part in several TV total specials such as the TV total Parallel Slalom and the TV total Wok World Championship. In the 2010 TV total Stock Car Crash Challenge, he took first place in the 3000cc class. In 2007 he worked alongside Charlotte Karlinder as an outside presenter for Big Brother on RTL II.

Due to low ratings, the decision was made not to continue the format and the episodes that had already been filmed were relocated to a less relevant programming slot. His former employer Ford ended their collaboration as a sponsor in 2007. From January to July 2008 he took part in the eighth German Big Brother season and co-hosted the weekly show Big Brother – Die Entscheidung on RTL II. Since 2012 he has presented the reality TV show Das ist das Leben! on RTL II and has presented the talent show Die Entertainer – Auf ins Rampenlicht on Super RTL since March 2012 with Anna-Maria Zimmermann.

The couple dropped out on the fifth episode In January 2016, he was a contestant on the German reality show Ich bin ein Star – Holt mich hier raus! (I'm a Celebrity - Get Me Out Of Here) on RTL and came fifth place. In 2020 he took part in the reality show Kampf der Realitystars – Schiffbruch am Traumstrand (Battle of the Reality Stars - Shipwrecked on Dream Beach) and Die Festspiele der Reality Stars – Wer ist die hellste Kerze? (The Festival of Reality Stars - Who is the Brightest Candle?). He also lost to Sonja Zietlow in December 2020 on the ProSieben show Schlag den Star (Beat the Celebrity). In 2022 he was a guest on Ich bin ein Star – Die Stunde danach (I'm a Celebrity - After-Hours) and Ich bin ein Star – Holt mich hier raus! Die große Dschungelparty (I'm a Celebrity - Get Me Out of Here! The Big Jungle Party).

Personal life 

He lives with his wife and their daughter in Seeberg, Cologne.

Controversies 
In November 2015, Milski was criticized for posting xenophobic statements on his Facebook page.

At the beginning of 2021, he was again heavily publicly criticized for his statements on the WDR television talkshow Die letzte Instanz (The Last Instance). After a repeat broadcast on January 29, 2021, there was a controversy about episode 8 of the show, in which Milski and other guests had spoken out against the proposed renaming of Gypsy Sauce, among other things. The Central Council of German Sinti and Roma also expressed outrage in a press release about "Anti-Romani statements".

Discography

Literature 

 Ich sag's. Verlag Kinzelbach, 2003, ISBN 3927069620.

Citations

External links 
 Jurgen Milski on the Internet Movie Database
 Jürgen Milski's Website
 

Ich bin ein Star – Holt mich hier raus! participants
Big Brother (franchise) contestants
German television presenters
Schlager groups
Living people
1963 births